Hathor 22 - Coptic Calendar - Hathor 24

The twenty-third day of the Coptic month of Hathor, the third month of the Coptic year. On a common year, this day corresponds to November 19, of the Julian Calendar, and December 2, of the Gregorian Calendar. This day falls in the Coptic season of Peret, the season of emergence. This day falls in the Nativity Fast.

Commemorations

Saints 

 The departure of Saint Cornelius the Centurion

Other commemorations 

 The consecration of the Church of Saint Marina the Martyr, in the city of Antioch

References 

Days of the Coptic calendar